Raman Parimala (born 21 November 1948) is an Indian mathematician known for her contributions to algebra.  She is the Arts & Sciences Distinguished Professor of mathematics at Emory University. For many years, she was a professor at Tata Institute of Fundamental Research (TIFR), Mumbai. She has been on the Mathematical Sciences jury for the Infosys Prize from 2019 and is on the Abel prize selection Committee 2021/2022.

Background 
Parimala was born and raised in Tamil Nadu, India. She studied in Saradha Vidyalaya Girls' High School and Stella Maris College at Chennai. She received  her M.Sc. from Madras University (1970) and Ph.D. from the
University of Mumbai  (1976); her advisor was R. Sridharan from TIFR.

Selected publications 
 Failure of a quadratic analogue of Serre's conjecture, Bulletin of the AMS, vol. 82, 1976, pp. 962–964 
 Quadratic spaces over polynomial extensions of regular rings of dimension 2, Mathematische Annalen, vol. 261, 1982, pp. 287–292 
 Galois cohomology of the Classical groups over fields of cohomological dimension≦2, E Bayer-Fluckiger, R Parimala - Inventiones mathematicae, 1995 - Springer 
 Hermitian analogue of a theorem of Springer, R Parimala, R. Sridharan, V Suresh - Journal of Algebra, 2001 - Elsevier 
 Classical groups and the Hasse principle, E Bayer-Fluckiger, R Parimala - Annals of Mathematics, 1998 - jstor.org

Honors 
On National Science Day in 2020, Smriti Irani, Minister, Women and Child Development, Government of India announced establishment of chair in name of Raman Parimala along with ten great Indian Women Scientists at Institutes across India.
Parimala was an invited speaker at the International Congress of Mathematicians in Zurich in 1994 and gave a talk Study of quadratic forms — some connections with geometry . She gave a plenary address Arithmetic of linear algebraic groups over two dimensional fields at the Congress in Hyderabad  in 2010.

 Fellow of the Indian Academy of Sciences
 Fellow of Indian National Science Academy
 Bhatnagar Award in 1987
 Honorary doctorate from the University of Lausanne in 1999
 Srinivasa Ramanujan Birth Centenary Award in 2003.
 TWAS Prize for Mathematics (2005).
 Fellow of the American Mathematical Society (2012)

Notes

External links 

Home page at Emory 
Parimala's biography in the Agnes Scott College database of women mathematicians

1948 births
Indian women mathematicians
Emory University faculty
Algebraists
Living people
Tamil scholars
Tata Institute of Fundamental Research alumni
Fellows of the American Mathematical Society
Scientists from Tamil Nadu
University of Madras alumni
Indian women science writers
Indian scientific authors
20th-century Indian women writers
20th-century Indian mathematicians
20th-century Indian women scientists
21st-century Indian mathematicians
21st-century Indian women scientists
21st-century Indian women writers
Women writers from Tamil Nadu
TWAS laureates
20th-century Indian non-fiction writers
21st-century Indian non-fiction writers
20th-century women mathematicians
21st-century women mathematicians
Recipients of the Shanti Swarup Bhatnagar Award in Mathematical Science